Laboratory Virtual Instrument Engineering Workbench (LabVIEW) is a system-design platform and development environment for a visual programming language from National Instruments.

The graphical language is named "G"; not to be confused with G-code.  The G dataflow language was originally developed by LabVIEW. LabVIEW is commonly used for data acquisition, instrument control, and industrial automation on a variety of operating systems (OSs), including macOS and other versions of Unix and Linux, as well as Microsoft Windows.

The latest versions of LabVIEW are LabVIEW 2022 Q3 (released in July 2022) and LabVIEW NXG 5.1 (released in January 2021). NI released the free for non-commercial use LabVIEW and LabVIEW NXG Community editions on April 28th, 2020.

Dataflow programming 
The programming paradigm used in LabVIEW, sometimes called G, is based on data availability. If there is enough data available to a subVI or function, that subVI or function will execute. Execution flow is determined by the structure of a graphical block diagram (the LabVIEW-source code) on which the programmer connects different function-nodes by drawing wires. These wires propagate variables and any node can execute as soon as all its input data become available. Since this might be the case for multiple nodes simultaneously, LabVIEW can execute inherently in parallel. Multi-processing and multi-threading hardware is exploited automatically by the built-in scheduler, which multiplexes multiple OS threads over the nodes ready for execution.

Graphical programming 

LabVIEW integrates the creation of user interfaces (termed front panels) into the development cycle. LabVIEW programs-subroutines are termed virtual instruments (VIs). Each VI has three components: a block diagram, a front panel, and a connector pane. The last is used to represent the VI in the block diagrams of others, calling VIs. The front panel is built using controls and indicators. Controls are inputs: they allow a user to supply information to the VI. Indicators are outputs: they indicate, or display, the results based on the inputs given to the VI. The back panel, which is a block diagram, contains the graphical source code. All of the objects placed on the front panel will appear on the back panel as terminals. The back panel also contains structures and functions which perform operations on controls and supply data to indicators. The structures and functions are found on the Functions palette and can be placed on the back panel. Collectively controls, indicators, structures, and functions are referred to as nodes. Nodes are connected using wires, e.g., two controls and an indicator can be wired to the addition function so that the indicator displays the sum of the two controls. Thus a virtual instrument can be run as either a program, with the front panel serving as a user interface, or, when dropped as a node onto the block diagram, the front panel defines the inputs and outputs for the  node through the connector pane. This implies each VI can be easily tested before being embedded as a subroutine into a larger program.

The graphical approach also allows nonprogrammers to build programs by dragging and dropping virtual representations of lab equipment with which they are already familiar. The LabVIEW programming environment, with the included examples and documentation, makes it simple to create small applications. This is a benefit on one side, but there is also a certain danger of underestimating the expertise needed for high-quality G programming. For complex algorithms or large-scale code, a programmer must possess extensive knowledge of the special LabVIEW syntax and the topology of its memory management. The most advanced LabVIEW development systems offer the ability to build stand-alone applications. Furthermore, it is possible to create distributed applications, which communicate by a client–server model, and are thus easier to implement due to the inherently parallel nature of G.

Widely-accepted design patterns 
Applications in LabVIEW are usually designed using well-known architectures, known as design patterns. The most common design patterns for graphical LabVIEW applications are listed in the table below.

Benefits

Interfacing to devices 
LabVIEW includes extensive support for interfacing to devices such as instruments, cameras, and other devices. Users interface to hardware by either writing direct bus commands (USB, GPIB, Serial) or using high-level, device-specific drivers that provide native LabVIEW function nodes for controlling the device.

LabVIEW includes built-in support for NI hardware platforms such as CompactDAQ and CompactRIO, with a large number of device-specific blocks for such hardware, the Measurement and Automation eXplorer (MAX) and Virtual Instrument Software Architecture (VISA) toolsets.

National Instruments makes thousands of device drivers available for download on the NI Instrument Driver Network (IDNet).

Code compiling 
LabVIEW includes a compiler that produces native code for the CPU platform. The graphical code is converted into Dataflow Intermediate Representation, and then translated into chunks of executable machine code by a compiler based on LLVM. Run-time engine calls these chunks, allowing better performance. The LabVIEW syntax is strictly enforced during the editing process and compiled into the executable machine code when requested to run or upon saving. In the latter case, the executable and the source code are merged into a single binary file. The execution is controlled by LabVIEW run-time engine, which contains some pre-compiled code to perform common tasks that are defined by the G language. The run-time engine governs execution flow, and provides a consistent interface to various operating systems, graphic systems and hardware components. The use of run-time environment makes the source code files portable across supported platforms. LabVIEW programs are slower than equivalent compiled C code, though like in other languages, program optimization often allows to mitigate issues with execution speed.

Large libraries 
Many libraries with a large number of functions for data acquisition, signal generation, mathematics, statistics, signal conditioning, analysis, etc., along with numerous for functions such as integration, filters, and other specialized abilities usually associated with data capture from hardware sensors is enormous. In addition, LabVIEW includes a text-based programming component named MathScript with added functions for signal processing, analysis, and mathematics. MathScript can be integrated with graphical programming using script nodes and uses a syntax that is compatible generally with MATLAB.

Parallel programming 
LabVIEW is an inherently concurrent language, so it is very easy to program multiple tasks that are performed in parallel via multithreading. For example, this is done easily by drawing two or more parallel while loops and connecting them to two separate nodes. This is a great benefit for test system automation, where it is common practice to run processes like test sequencing, data recording, and hardware interfacing in parallel.

Ecosystem 
Due to the longevity and popularity of the LabVIEW language, and the ability for users to extend its functions, a large ecosystem of third party add-ons has developed via contributions from the community. This ecosystem is available on the LabVIEW Tools Network, which is a marketplace for both free and paid LabVIEW add-ons.

User community 
There is a low-cost LabVIEW Student Edition aimed at educational institutions for learning purposes. There is also an active community of LabVIEW users who communicate through several electronic mailing lists (email groups) and Internet forums.

Home Bundle Edition
National Instruments provides a low cost LabVIEW Home Bundle Edition.

Community Edition 
National Instruments provides a free-for-non-commercial use version called LabVIEW Community Edition. This version includes everything in the Professional Editions of LabVIEW, has no watermarks, and includes the LabVIEW NXG Web Module for non-commercial use. These editions may also be used by K-12 schools.

Criticism 
LabVIEW is a proprietary product of National Instruments. Unlike common programming languages such as C or Fortran, LabVIEW is not managed or specified by any third party standards committee such as American National Standards Institute (ANSI), Institute of Electrical and Electronics Engineers (IEEE), International Organization for Standardization (ISO).

Non-textual 
Since G language is non-textual, software tools such as versioning, side-by-side (or diff) comparison, and version code change tracking cannot be applied in the same manner as for textual programming languages. There are some additional tools to make comparison and merging of code with source code control (versioning) tools such as subversion, CVS and Perforce.

No zoom function 
There is no ability to zoom in to (or enlarge) a virtual instrument (VI) which will be hard to see on a large high-resolution monitor. However, the ability to zoom has been added into LabVIEW NXG.

Release history 
In 2005, starting with LabVIEW 8.0, major versions are released around the first week of August, to coincide with the annual National Instruments conference NI Week, and followed by a bug-fix release the following February.

In 2009, National Instruments began naming releases after the year in which they are released. A bug-fix is termed a Service Pack, for example, the 2009 service pack 1 was released in February 2010.

In 2017, National Instruments moved the annual conference to May and released LabVIEW 2017 alongside a completely redesigned LabVIEW NXG 1.0 built on Windows Presentation Foundation (WPF).

Repositories and libraries
OpenG, as well as LAVA Code Repository (LAVAcr), serve as repositories for a wide range of Open Source LabVIEW applications and libraries. SourceForge has LabVIEW listed as one of the possible languages in which code can be written.

VI Package Manager has become the standard package manager for LabVIEW libraries. It is very similar in purpose to Ruby's RubyGems and Perl's CPAN, although it provides a graphical user interface similar to the Synaptic Package Manager. VI Package Manager provides access to a repository of the OpenG (and other) libraries for LabVIEW.

Tools exist to convert MathML into G code.

Related software
National Instruments also offers a product named Measurement Studio, which offers many of the test, measurement, and control abilities of LabVIEW, as a set of classes for use with Microsoft Visual Studio. This allows developers to harness some of LabVIEW's strengths within the text-based .NET Framework. National Instruments also offers LabWindows/CVI as an alternative for ANSI C programmers.

When applications need sequencing, users often use LabVIEW with the TestStand test management software, also from National Instruments.

The Ch interpreter is a C/C++ interpreter that can be embedded in LabVIEW for scripting.

DSP Robotics' FlowStone DSP also uses a form of graphical programming similar to LabVIEW, but is limited to the robotics industry respectively.

LabVIEW has a direct node with modeFRONTIER, a multidisciplinary and multi-objective optimization and design environment, written to allow coupling to almost any computer-aided engineering tool. Both can be part of the same process workflow description, and can be virtually driven by the optimization technologies available in modeFRONTIER.

See also 
 Comparison of numerical-analysis software
 Dataflow programming
 Fourth-generation programming language
 Visual programming language
 Graphical system design

Related software titles
 Lego Mindstorms NXT, whose programming environment NXT-G is based on LabVIEW, and can be programmed within LabVIEW.
 20-sim
 LabWindows/CVI
 MATLAB/Simulink
 Virtual instrumentation
 CompactDAQ
 CompactRIO
 TOMVIEW

Free and open-source packages
 PWCT — GPL license
 DRAKON — public domain, with some open-source components

References

Further reading

Articles on specific uses

Articles on education uses

External links 
 

Numerical software
Visual programming languages
Numerical programming languages
Numerical analysis software for Linux
Numerical analysis software for macOS
Numerical analysis software for Windows
Cross-platform software
Pedagogic integrated development environments
Synchronous programming languages
Software modeling language